CitySourced is a civic engagement SaaS (Software as a Service) platform that connects citizens to local government agencies and the services they provide. The platform provides HTML5 and iOS/Android citizen-facing client applications that connect with a CRM and Service Request Management application tailored specifically for use within the public sector.

History
In 2006, Jason Kiesel created FreedomSpeaks, a non-partisan political social network that enabled citizens to start grassroots activist campaigns targeting their publicly elected officials. In the spring of 2009, FreedomSpeaks began development on the CitySourced mobile application to help citizen report problems in their neighborhood directly to City Hall. CitySourced officially launched in September 2009 at the 2009 TechCrunch50 startup conference. During the Q&A portion of the presentation, Kevin Rose stated of the application: "I’d like a stream for my neighborhood of things that need to take action on." 

In December 2011, the company raised a $1.3M Series A investment and officially changed its name from FreedomSpeaks, Inc. to CitySourced, Inc.

In March 2013, the company launched ZenFunder, a civic crowdfunding product that allows municipal governments and schools districts to raise funds for specific projects by crowdfunding the proposed projects directly from residents and/or citizens. The ZenFunder product was sunsetted approximately one year later due to a lack of customer demand.

In April 2019, the company merged with government CRM software provider Rock Solid Technologies, Inc. through the backing of the Austin-based private equity firm Strattam Capital.

Awards
 2009: TechCrunch50 Finalist at the 2009 TechCrunch50 Conference
2013: IBM Beacon Award Finalist

References

External links
 

Mobile social software
Geosocial networking
Companies based in Los Angeles
IOS software
Android (operating system) software
BlackBerry software
Windows Mobile software
Windows Phone software